Oruro (Quechua: Uru Uru; Aymara: Ururu) is a department of Bolivia, with an area of . Its capital is the city of Oruro. According to the 2012 census, the Oruro department had a population of 494,178.

Provinces of Oruro 
The department is divided into 16 provinces which are further subdivided into municipalities and cantons.

Note: Eduardo Abaroa Province (#5) is both north of and south of Sebastián Pagador Province (#6).

Government 
The chief executive officer of Bolivian departments (since May 2010) is the governor; until then, the office was called the prefect, and until 2006 the prefect was appointed by the president of Bolivia. The current governor, Santos Tito of the Movement for Socialism – Political Instrument for the Sovereignty of the Peoples, was elected on 4 April 2010.

The chief legislative body of the department is the Departmental Legislative Assembly, a body also first elected on 4 April 2010. It consists of 33 members: 16 elected by each of the department's provinces; 16 elected based on proportional representation; and minority indigenous representative selected by the Uru-Chipaya people.

Demographics

Languages 
The languages spoken in the department are mainly Spanish, Quechua and Aymara. The following table shows the number of those belonging to the recognised group of speakers.

Notable people 
 Evo Morales, who was the Bolivian president from 2006 to 2019, was born in the village of Isallawi near Orinoca.
 Juan Mendoza, hero and pioneer of the Bolivian aviation.
 Zulma Yugar, who is a Bolivian politician and folk singer with international recognition and influence.

Places of interest 
 Sajama National Park
 Parinacota Volcano
 Sajama Lines
 Poopó Lake
 Lake Uru Uru
 Paria, first Spanish settlement in Bolivia, former Inca city.

See also 
 Oruro Symphony Orchestra
 Santa Fe, Oruro
 Juan Mendoza Airport

References

External links 
 
 Oruro Travel Guide
 Weather in Oruro
 Carnaval 2009 folklore
 Technical University of Oruro
 Oruro News
 Feria Exposición 
 
 Full information of Oruro Department

 
Departments of Bolivia